Hide in Plain Sight is a 1980 American drama film directed by and starring James Caan with the storyline based on an actual case from the files of New York attorney Salvatore R. Martoche who represented Tom Leonard, a real-life Buffalo, New York, victim who had sued to recover contact with his children estranged by the culpability of the new husband and government, soon realizing his own past is coming back to get him.

Plot
Divorced father Thomas Hacklin discovers, on visiting his children, that his ex-wife's residence has been abandoned; he is unable to locate or contact them.  He is mystified after approaching the authorities, who refuse to assist, but speculates when he becomes aware that her new husband is in the United States Federal Witness Protection Program.  As he makes inroads into finding their location, the police and authorities make it more difficult for him to make contact.  He becomes determined upon discovering the government advised the low-tier mobster new husband to marry his ex-wife, in order to disqualify her from testifying against him in the eventuality of a trial for his criminal activities. The mob follows Hacklin's actions for their own purposes.

Cast
 James Caan as Thomas Hacklin, Jr.
 Jill Eikenberry as Alisa
 Robert Viharo as Jack Scolese
 Barbra Rae as Ruthie Hacklin
 Joe Grifasi as Matty Stanke
 Kenneth McMillan as Sam Marzetta
 Josef Sommer as Jason R. Reid 
 Danny Aiello as Sal Carvello
 Beatrice Winde as Unemployment Clerk
 Andrew Gordon Fenwick as Andy Hacklin
 Heather Bicknell as Junie Hacklin
 David Clennon as Richard Fieldston

Reception
Hide in Plain Sight received a mixed reception from critics.

Roger Ebert of the Chicago Sun-Times gave the film two out of four stars and praised the acting, but ultimately viewed the film negatively, calling it "a frustrating real-life thriller that makes the fatal mistake of being more true to real life than to the demands of narrative." Variety also wrote the film a mixed review, stating "Hide in Plain Sight has some of the makings of a good, honest film. It tells the true story of a working man's fight against the system, features several poignant moments, and makes a number of political messages in an effective yet unobtrusive manner. But in his directorial debut, James Caan never musters the energy or emotion needed to break the unbearably slow, dismal tone." Filmink magazine wrote "Caan’s handling of the material is genuinely assured and interesting – he uses lots of masters and long takes (he seems influenced by Claude Lelouch). His acting is excellent too, although the script doesn’t quite work; it never seems to make up its mind if it wants to go realistic or Hollywood.

Production
The film was Caan's passion project, taking him two years to make. It was his intention to release the film without a music score, but MGM executives prevailed.

Release

Home media
Released on VHS: 1981; 1992, MGM/UA Home Video and DVD: 2010, Warner Home Video (Warner Archive).

References

External links
 

1980 films
1980 drama films
Films scored by Leonard Rosenman
Films set in 1967
Films set in New York (state)
Films shot in New York (state)
Metro-Goldwyn-Mayer films
1980 directorial debut films
1980s English-language films